Gymnothorax mishrai is a species of fish from the moray eel family. A single specimen was used to describe the species. The specimen was caught off the Bay of Bengal in India. The species is brown in color and plain, they also have brown-rimmed jaw pores and 134 vertebrae.

References 

mishrai
Fish described in 2015
Fish of India